Domenico Tempio (1750–1821) was an Italian writer who mainly wrote in the Sicilian language or dialect. During his lifetime, he was considered a major poet, and was much praised, but after his death his work was largely forgotten, until a reawakening of interest following the second world war. His poem La Caristia ("The famine"), describing a famine and rioting in Catania in 1797-98, is regarded as his major work.

Works
Operi di Duminicu Tempiu catanisi (1814-1815) is a collection of his poetry, edited by Francesco Strano. The best-known poems are L'Odi l'Ignuranza Supra, The Maldicenza sconfitta, Veru Piaciri Lu, The Mbrugghereidi, The Numi Scerra di li, Lu cuntrastu allayed, Paci di Marcuni, Li and Li Pauni Nuzzi.
La Caristia (1848), is his most important work, published posthumously by Vincenzo Percolla. It is a poem in twenty cantos.
Tempio di Domenico Poesie (1874) is the second edition of his works, with many additions.
Erotic poetry was collected in 1926 by Raffaele Corso Di Vincenzo and by Maria and Santo Cali in 1970.

References

1750 births
1821 deaths
Writers from Catania
Italian male writers
Sicilian-language poets
Italian poets